Radiolab is a radio program produced by WNYC, a public radio station in New York City, and broadcast on public radio stations in the United States. The show is nationally syndicated and is available as a podcast. Live shows were first offered in 2008.

Radiolab was founded by Jad Abumrad and Robert Krulwich in 2002. As of September 2020, Radiolab is hosted by Latif Nasser and Lulu Miller.

The show focuses on topics of a scientific, philosophical, and political nature. The show attempts to approach broad, difficult topics such as "time" and "morality" in an accessible and light-hearted manner and with a distinctive audio production style.

Radiolab received a 2007 National Academies Communication Award "for their imaginative use of radio to make science accessible to broad audiences". The program has received two Peabody Awards; first in 2010 and again in 2014. In 2011, Abumrad received the MacArthur grant.

Although Radiolab is a "limited run series", numerous seasons of five to ten episodes each have been produced.

History
Having majored in experimental music composition and production at Oberlin College, Jad Abumrad worked for New York City Pacifica affiliate WBAI before landing a job freelancing for National Public Radio (NPR). In 2002 he produced a series of post-9/11 radio documentaries called 24 Hours at the Edge of Ground Zero, and regularly contributed material to Studio 360, both for WNYC. The first weekly episodes of Radiolab aired in May 2002, and each compiled two hours' worth of NPR stories around a particular theme with between-story commentary from Jad Abumrad. These themes were not necessarily science-related, but tackled issues such as the death penalty, religious fundamentalism and politics in Africa and the Middle East.

In 2003 Abumrad was given an assignment to interview ABC News science reporter Robert Krulwich and the two men discovered they had a lot in common: both were alumni of Oberlin College (though 25 years apart), and both had worked at WBAI before moving on to WNYC and NPR. They became fast friends and began collaborating on experimental radio pieces, the first of which they sent to Ira Glass for a proposed Flag Day episode of This American Life. "It was horrible", Glass said of the tape in an interview with Abumrad and Krulwich. "It's just amazing that you were able to put together such a wonderful program after that."

Not to be dissuaded, Abumrad and Krulwich continued to collaborate. By 2004 Radiolab had become an hour-long, science-themed program characterized by Abumrad's unique sound design style, and Robert Krulwich appeared as a "guest host" on a program about time in early June. By the following episode ("Space", aired two weeks later), they were co-hosts, launching into the program's first official season in 2005.

Formerly distributed nationally by NPR, WNYC began distributing the show in 2015. The change was noticeably marked by the omission of NPR's name in the show's opening audio sequence after the tagline, "You're listening to Radiolab...from WNYC."

Robert Krulwich retired from his role as co-host in February 2020. In September of the same year, Lulu Miller and Latif Nasser were named co-hosts, succeeding the role of Krulwich.

Format
Radiolab is aired on over 300 radio stations across the U.S. Each episode is one hour long and tackles various philosophical and scientific topics. However, the show began in 2002 as a three-hour weekly show on New York City radio station WNYC's AM signal. It wasn't until 2004 that Krulwich began appearing as a regular guest and eventually as a co-host.

Each Radiolab episode is elaborately stylized. For instance, thematic—and often dissonant and atonal—music accompanies much of the commentary. In an April 2011 interview with The New York Times, Abumrad explained the choice in music: "I put a lot of jaggedy sounds, little plurps and things, strange staccato, percussive things." In addition, previously recorded interview segments are interspersed in the show's live dialogue, adding a layered, call-and-response effect to the questions posed by the hosts. These recordings are often unedited and the interviewee's asides appear in the final product. In the same New York Times interview, Abumrad said, "You're trying to capture the rhythms and the movements, the messiness of the actual experience.... It sounds like life." And unlike traditional journalism, in which the reader is given only access to the final article, not the interview, Abumrad added that Radiolabs process is more transparent.

As of June 15, 2009, the podcast offers full, hour-long episodes on a regular schedule with a variable number of podcasts in between "that follow some detour or left turn, explore music we love, take you to live events, and generally try to shake up your universe". These extra podcasts, referred to as "Shorts", are occasionally combined into full-length compilation episodes.

In the UK, episodes are broadcast on BBC Radio 4 Extra on Sunday evenings.

Response
Radiolab has been widely acclaimed among listeners and critics alike. Around 1.8 million listeners tune in to the show, though most of them access it via podcasts. It has been hailed, along with This American Life, as one of the most innovative shows on American radio.

In a 2007–2008 study by Multimedia Research (sponsored by the National Science Foundation), it was determined that over 95 percent of listeners reported that the science-based material featured on Radiolab was accessible. Additionally, upwards of 80 percent of listeners reported that the program's pace was exciting, and over 80 percent reported that the layering of interviews was engaging.

Radiolab has won several awards, including two Peabody Awards for broadcast excellence. In spring 2011, Krulwich and Abumrad took the show on a live, national tour, selling out in cities such as New York, Seattle, and Los Angeles.

In April 2015, the podcast titled "60 Words" (aired on April 18, 2014) garnered a second Peabody Award for Radiolab.

Radiolab was award for the Shorty Award for Best Podcast.

Controversy
On September 24, 2012, in a podcast titled "The Fact of the Matter", the program ran a segment about the yellow rain incidents in Laos and surrounding countries in the 1970s. Included in the story was an interview with Hmong veteran and refugee Eng Yang, with his niece Kao Kalia Yang serving as translator. After hearing the segment, Kao Kalia Yang and others complained that her uncle's viewpoints had been dismissed or edited out, that interviewer Robert Krulwich had treated them callously, and that the overall approach to the story had been racist. The complaints prompted several rounds of allegation, apology, rebuttal, and edits to the podcast, as well as commentary in various sources such as the public radio newspaper Current.

On August 12, 2017, Radiolab removed an episode titled "Truth Trolls" about the attacks on LaBeouf, Rönkkö & Turner's HEWILLNOTDIVIDE.US art project by trolls. The program had been criticized for appearing to condone the actions of extremist groups, with Turner condemning the reporting as "abhorrent and irresponsible" for describing the vandalism and harassment they had been subjected to as "a really encouraging story" and "comforting." Abumrad issued an apology for giving the impression that they "essentially condoned some pretty despicable ideology and behavior," while WNYC stated that they supported Radiolab'''s decision to remove the podcast, adding that "Radiolab unambiguously rejects the beliefs and actions of the trolls, and deeply regrets doing anything that would imply differently."

Radiolab episodes
Through stories, interviews, and thought experiments, each hour-long episode usually deals with a specific topic and investigates it from several different angles. Sound design (not a common practice in modern radio programming), rapid dialog edits and sound effects are used to build a soundscape constructing an expository conversation, and usually feature brief, seemingly unscripted tangents. The episode credits are generally read by people who were interviewed or featured on the show, rather than by the hosts, while the program credits are read by listeners.

Radiolab live
Episode 3 of Season 12, titled "Apocalyptical – Live from the Paramount in Seattle", was recorded at one of the live show tour locations that Radiolab performed. Unlike most shows, this show was recorded both visually and auditorily, and can be viewed on their official website. The tour covered 21 cities and primarily focused on a speculative fringe theory regarding the Cretaceous–Paleogene extinction event that has not been published in a peer-reviewed journal. The fundamental new idea surrounding this theory is that when a large asteroid impacted the Earth, the asteroid driving into the ground caused the rock to become heated so extremely that it became gaseous. This "rock-gas" was then ejected outside the Earth's atmosphere and into space. The rock-gas, after cooling into many tiny glass particles, was pulled back in by Earth's gravity. The majority of this "glass-rain" burned up in the Earth's atmosphere upon re-entry, causing the Earth's atmosphere to become superheated, killing most of the species living on the surface of the Earth within a matter of hours. The episode did not include any discussion of the problems with the theory or that it has not been published in a peer-reviewed journal.

 More Perfect 
In June 2016, Radiolab launched their first "spinoff series" entitled More Perfect. The series examines controversial and historic cases in the Supreme Court of the United States. The show's title comes from the US Constitution which begins "We the people, in order to form a more perfect Union". The team working on the podcast became interested in the topic after studying an adoption case related to the Indian Child Welfare Act.

The show's first season launched on June 1, 2016, and ran for eight episodes. The second season returned on September 30, 2017, and aired nine episodes. The show's third season began on September 18, 2018, and ran for nine episodes.

Since then, the show has not aired any more episodes, although reruns are still occasionally posted in the Radiolab feed.

References

External links

  on the public radio program Bullseye with Jesse Thorn''
 
 : Jad Abumrad and Robert Krulwich interviewed by Charlie Rose on January 2, 2013.

2002 radio programme debuts
Audio podcasts
American documentary radio programs
NPR programs
Radio in New York City
Peabody Award-winning radio programs
Science podcasts
2002 establishments in New York City
WNYC Studios programs
American podcasts
2005 podcast debuts
Technology podcasts